The Fifth Municipality (In Italian: Quinta Municipalità or Municipalità 5) is one of the ten boroughs in which the Italian city of Naples is divided. It is the most populated municipality.

Geography
The municipality is located in central-western area of the city.

Its territory includes the zones of Rione Alto, Rione Antignano, Petraio, Materdei and Parco Grifeo.

Administrative division
The Fifth Municipality is divided into 2 quarters:

References

External links
 Municipalità 5 page on Naples website

Municipality 05